Launaea thalassica is a species of flowering plants of the family Asteraceae. The species is endemic to Cape Verde. It is listed as critically endangered by the IUCN. The species name thalassica is Greek meaning "of the sea".

Distribution
The species occurs in the north and northeast of the island of Brava. The plant is found between 300–500 m elevation.

References

thalassica
Endemic flora of Cape Verde
Flora of Brava, Cape Verde